The variable grass mouse (Akodon varius)  is a species of rodent in the family Cricetidae. It is known only from Bolivia, where it is found at elevations from 400 to 3000 m.

References

Musser, G. G. and M. D. Carleton. 2005. Superfamily Muroidea. pp. 894–1531 in Mammal Species of the World a Taxonomic and Geographic Reference. D. E. Wilson and D. M. Reeder eds. Johns Hopkins University Press, Baltimore.

Akodon
Mammals of Bolivia
Mammals described in 1902
Taxa named by Oldfield Thomas
Taxonomy articles created by Polbot
Taxobox binomials not recognized by IUCN